The Blue Ridge Subdivision is a railroad line owned by CSX Transportation in the U.S. states of Tennessee, North Carolina, and South Carolina. It was formerly part of the CSX Huntington West Division. It became part of the CSX Florence Division on June 20, 2016. At its north end it continues south from the Erwin Terminal Subdivision and at its south end it branches off onto the Belton Subdivision and the Spartanburg Subdivision.

See also
 List of CSX Transportation lines

References

CSX Transportation lines
History of rail transportation in the United States
Rail transportation in the United States
Rail infrastructure in South Carolina
Rail infrastructure in North Carolina
Rail infrastructure in Tennessee